Rowing at the 1976 Summer Olympics in Montreal featured races in 14 events, all held at the rowing basin on Notre Dame Island. Women's events held at 1000 m debuted (they would be lengthened to the men's events of 2000 m at the 1988 Summer Olympics in Seoul).

There was a desire by the IOC's program commission to reduce the number of competitors and a number of recommendations were put to the IOC's executive board on 23 February 1973, which were all accepted. Rowing was the only sport where the number of competitors was increased, and women were admitted for the first time in Olympic history. The quad scull events were introduced at this Olympics, without coxswain for men and with coxswain for women.

Participating nations
A total of 593 rowers from 31 nations competed at the Montreal Games:

Medal table

Medal summary

Men's events

Women's events

Notes

References

Volume 1 Part 1 (up to page 279)
Volume 1 Part 2 (from page 280)
Volume 2
Volume 3

External links
 International Olympic Committee medal database

 
1976 Summer Olympics events
1976
Summer Olympics